Ubuntu GNOME (formerly Ubuntu GNOME Remix) is a discontinued Linux distribution, distributed as free and open-source software. It used a pure GNOME 3 desktop environment with GNOME Shell, rather than the Unity graphical shell. Starting with version 13.04 it became an official "flavour" of the Ubuntu operating system.

In April 2017, it was announced that 17.04 would be the last release. The distribution was to be discontinued in favor of the standard Ubuntu distribution, which switched from using Unity to GNOME Shell as its desktop environment, starting with its 17.10 release.

History
The project began as an unofficial "remix" because some users preferred the GNOME 3 desktop over Unity. Ubuntu GNOME 12.10 Quantal Quetzal was the first stable version released on 18 October 2012.

Writing in October 2013, Jim Lynch stated:

Jim Lynch reviewed Ubuntu GNOME 14.04 LTS again in April 2014 and concluded,

On 5 April 2017 Canonical Executive Chairman and Ubuntu founder Mark Shuttleworth announced that the mainline version of Ubuntu will move from Unity to the GNOME 3 desktop starting by version 18.04 LTS, which would make it virtually identical to Ubuntu GNOME. It was later revealed that Ubuntu 17.10 would in fact be the first version to use GNOME.

Shuttleworth wrote on 8 April 2017, "We will invest in Ubuntu GNOME with the intent of delivering a fantastic all-GNOME desktop. We're helping the Ubuntu GNOME team, not creating something different or competitive with that effort. While I am passionate about the design ideas in Unity, and hope GNOME may be more open to them now, I think we should respect the GNOME design leadership by delivering GNOME the way GNOME wants it delivered. Our role in that, as usual, will be to make sure that upgrades, integration, security, performance and the full experience are fantastic."

In light of Ubuntu's announcement that they would switch desktop environments from Unity to GNOME, the Ubuntu GNOME developers announced on 13 April 2017 that the distribution would merge into the mainline Ubuntu, starting with the 17.10 release.

Releases

See also 

 Comparison of Linux distributions

References

External links 

 
 

IA-32 Linux distributions
Operating system distributions bootable from read-only media
Ubuntu derivatives
X86-64 Linux distributions
Discontinued Linux distributions
Linux distributions